Datuk Arthur Joseph Kurup (born 4 August 1982) is a Malaysian politician who has served as the Deputy Minister of Science, Technology and Innovation in the Pakatan Harapan (PH) administration under Prime Minister Anwar Ibrahim and Minister Chang Lih Kang since December 2022 and the Member of Parliament (MP) for Pensiangan since May 2018. He served as the Deputy Minister of Works in the Barisan Nasional (BN) administration under former Prime Minister Ismail Sabri Yaakob and former Minister Fadillah Yusof from August 2021 to the collapse of the BN administration in November 2022 and the Deputy Minister in the Prime Minister's Department in charge of Economic Affairs in the Perikatan Nasional (PN) administration under former Prime Minister Muhyiddin Yassin and former Minister Mustapa Mohamed from March 2020 to the collapse of the PN administration in August 2021.  He is a member of the Parti Bersatu Rakyat Sabah (PBRS), a component party of the BN coalition. He has also served as the 2nd President of PBRS since January 2023. He also previously served as the Deputy President of PBRS from November 2015 to his promotion to party presidency in January 2023, the Vice President and Youth Chief of PBRS.

Career 
Arthur previously worked as a Trade and Legal Officer at the World Trade Organization (WTO) in Geneva, Switzerland before returning to Malaysia. He served as a Director of Sabah Housing and Development Town Board.

Politics 
In the 2018 general election, his party of United Sabah People's Party (PBRS) fielded him to contest the Pensiangan parliamentary seat to succeed his father and party president, Joseph Kurup. He faced Raymond Ahuar from the People's Justice Party (PKR) and defeated him.

Election results

Honour
  :
  Knight Commander of the Order of the Territorial Crown (PMW) – Datuk (2021)

References

External links 
 

Living people
People from Sabah
Kadazan-Dusun people
1982 births
21st-century Malaysian lawyers
Parti Bersatu Rakyat Sabah politicians
Members of the Dewan Rakyat
21st-century Malaysian politicians
Knight Commander of the Order of the Territorial Crown